Top-seeded Margaret Smith won the women's singles tennis title at the 1966 Australian Championships after Nancy Richey withdrew from the final. This is the only walkover in a Ladies Singles Final of a Grand Slam tournament and was Smith's 7th straight Australian Open title.

Seeds
The seeded players are listed below. Margaret Smith is the champion; others show the round in which they were eliminated.

  Margaret Smith (champion)
  Nancy Richey (finalist)
  Lesley Turner (third round)
  Carole Caldwell Graebner (semifinals)
  Judy Tegart (quarterfinals)
  Gail Sherriff (third round)
  Jan Lehane (second round)
  Madonna Schacht (quarterfinals)
  Robyn Ebbern (third round)
  Joan Gibson (quarterfinals)
  Karen Krantzcke (third round)
  Kerry Melville (semifinals)

Draw

Key
 Q = Qualifier
 WC = Wild card
 LL = Lucky loser
 r = Retired

Finals

Earlier rounds

Section 1

Section 2

Section 3

Section 4

External links
 1966 Australian Championships on ITFtennis.com, the source for this draw

1966 in women's tennis
1966
Women's Singles
1966 in Australian women's sport